The Commonwealth of Massachusetts is governed by a set of political tenets laid down in its state constitution. Legislative power is held by the bicameral General Court, which is composed of the Senate and House of Representatives. The governor exercises executive power with other independently elected officers: the Attorney General, Secretary of the Commonwealth, and Auditor. The state's judicial power rests in the Supreme Judicial Court, which manages its court system. Cities and towns act through local governmental bodies to the extent that they are authorized by the Commonwealth on local issues, including limited home-rule authority. Although most county governments were abolished during the 1990s and 2000s, a handful remain.

Massachusetts' capital city is Boston. The seat of power is in Beacon Hill, home of the legislative and executive branches. The Supreme Judicial Court is in nearby Pemberton Hill.

Federal government

Congressional delegation 

For Congressional representation outlined in the United States Constitution, Massachusetts elects two senators to the Senate, as well as a number of Representatives to the House of Representatives proportional to the state's population in the US Census. From the 2010 Census, Massachusetts has nine representatives. As of the 2020 election, all these officials have been from the Democratic Party.  This makes the Massachusetts federal delegation the largest single-party federal delegation in the United States.

Federal courts 
For federal court cases the State falls within the United States District Court for the District of Massachusetts and appeals to the United States Court of Appeals for the First Circuit.

Electoral College 
Massachusetts has 11 votes in the electoral college for election of the President, which are given on a winner-take-all basis. The state joined the National Popular Vote Interstate Compact in 2009, though the Compact has not yet achieved sufficient national support to be activated.

Executive 
Massachusetts has 151 departments or agencies and over 700 independent boards and commissions. The head of the state's Executive Branch is by law the Governor,  but it also has two types of executive officials that do not fall in the Governor's control. Constitutional officers are the elected officials specified by the state constitution, while independent agencies are created by statute and the governor exercises only indirect control through appointments.

Constitutional officers

Governor's Council 

The Governor's Council consists of eight elected councilors elected from districts every two years, as well as the lieutenant governor. The council provides for advice and consent for judicial appointments, appointment of certain public officials including notaries public and justices of the peace, pardons and commutations, and certain payments from the state treasury. The governor is the nonvoting president of the council, but is chaired by the Lieutenant Governor in their absence.

District attorneys and Sheriffs - Independently elected by district

Some executive agencies are tasked by the legislature with formulating regulations by following a prescribed procedure. Most of these are collected in the Code of Massachusetts Regulations.

Cabinet and government agencies
The governor has a cabinet of eleven secretaries. They supervise the state agencies, which are under the direct control of the governor. Nine of the secretaries preside over the executive office of their respective areas.

Legislature

The state legislature is formally known as the Massachusetts General Court, reflecting its colonial-era judicial duties. It has two houses: the 40-member Senate and the 160-member House of Representatives. Members of both houses have two-year terms. The Speaker of the House presides over the House of Representatives and controls the flow of legislation. The President is the presiding officer of the Senate.

The General Court is responsible for enacting the state's laws. A bill signed by the governor, or passed by two-thirds of both houses over his or her veto, becomes law. Its session laws are published in the Acts and Resolves of Massachusetts, which are codified as the General Laws of Massachusetts. On June 9, 2017, S&P Global Ratings downgraded Massachusetts' bond rating to AA (the third-highest tier) due to the legislature's inability to replenish the state's rainy day fund in the face of above-average economic growth.

Judiciary

The judiciary is the branch of the government that interprets and applies state law, ensures equal justice under law, and provides a mechanism for dispute resolution. The Massachusetts court system consists of the Supreme Judicial Court, the Appeals Court, and seven trial-court departments.

Supreme Judicial Court 

Judicial power is centered in the Supreme Judicial Court, which oversees the court system. In addition to its appellate functions, the Supreme Judicial Court is responsible for the governance of the judiciary and the bar, makes (or approves) rules for the operation of the courts and, on request, provides advisory opinions to the governor and legislature on legal issues. The Supreme Judicial Court also oversees affiliated judicial agencies, including the Board of Bar Overseers, the Board of Bar Examiners, the Clients' Security Board, the Massachusetts Mental Health Legal Advisors Committee, and Massachusetts Correctional Legal Services.

Appeals Court 

The Appeals Court the state appellate court, which means that the justices review decisions made in the Trial Courts. The Appeals Court also has jurisdiction over appeals from final decisions of three State agencies: the Appellate Tax Board, the Industrial Accident Board and the Commonwealth Employment Relations Board. The Appeals Court consists of a chief justice and twenty-four associate justices.

Trial courts 
Superior Court

District Court

Land Court

Housing Court

Juvenile Court

Probate and Family Court

Boston Municipal Court

County government 

Only the southeastern third of the state has county governments; in western, central, and northeastern Massachusetts, traditional county-level government was eliminated during the late 1990s. District attorneys and sheriffs are elected by constituencies which mainly follow county boundaries, and are funded by the state budget. Although most county governments have been abolished, all counties still have a sheriff's department which operates correctional facilities and service of process in the county.

Sheriffs

District attorney 
District attorneys are elected in 11 districts and serve as a public prosecutor representing the Commonwealth during criminal prosecutions. Most district attorneys are elected within the boundaries of a single county, and the district courts they operate in are within that county. The exception is Hampshire and Franklin Counties and the Town of Athol which make up the Northwestern District; and Barnstable, Dukes, and Nantucket Counties which make up the Cape and Islands District. Some districts that follow traditional county lines are officially known by a different name than the county, but they may also informally be called by the county name.

Registry of deeds 

All counties in Massachusetts have at least one registry of deeds, which is responsible for recording and holding copies of deeds, titles, and other land records within their district. Each registry is run by an elected register of deeds, who serves for 6 year terms. Most counties have one registry, but some are divided into separate districts with their own registry. There are 21 registries.

Municipal government 

Massachusetts shares with the five other New England states the New England town form of government.  All land in Massachusetts is divided among cities and towns and there are no unincorporated areas, population centers, or townships. Massachusetts has four kinds of public-school districts: local schools, regional schools, vocational-technical schools, and charter schools.

Elections and politics 

Massachusetts is known for its progressive politics, and is a stronghold of American Liberalism and the Democratic Party. In a 2018 Gallup poll Massachusetts was the state with the highest percentage of its population identifying as liberal and the lowest percentage identifying as conservative, at 35% and 21% respectively. This and the high profile of well known politicians from Massachusetts such as the Kennedy family has led to the derogatory political phrase "Massachusetts Liberal".

Transparency
The state has an open-meeting law enforced by the attorney general, and a public-records law enforced by the Secretary of the Commonwealth. A 2008 report by the Better Government Association and National Freedom of Information Coalition ranked Massachusetts 43rd out of the 50 US states in government transparency. It gave the state a grade of "F," based on the time, cost, and comprehensiveness of access to public records. Access to government records and the actions of the Secretary in enforcing the law became an issue in the 2014 campaign for the office. Incumbent William Galvin cited his previous requests that the legislature revise the Public Records Law to facilitate access. According to the governor, he is exempt from the Public Records Law. A reform law was signed on June 3, 2016 and took effect on January 1, 2017, imposing stricter time limits and lower costs.

See also 

Outline of Massachusetts
Index of Massachusetts-related articles
Politics of Massachusetts
Law of Massachusetts
Law enforcement in Massachusetts
Judiciary of Massachusetts
Courts of Massachusetts
United States Congress
United States congressional delegations from Massachusetts
List of United States senators from Massachusetts
Massachusetts's congressional districts
List of United States representatives from Massachusetts
State governments of the United States (comparison)

References

Further reading 
 Organizational structure of the Government

External links 

Massachusetts legal materials - Legal Information Institute

 
Massachusetts